Beetin (BE27 or BE29) is a ribosome-inactivating protein found in the leaves of  sugar beets, Beta vulgaris L. Beetins are a type-I (single-chain) proteins.  The expression of beetin is only found in mature plants, but is present in all developing stages.

Role as Antiviral Protein 
Beet 27 is also an antiviral protein that acts as a defense mechanism to protect the plant from a viral infection. This action can be induced by compounds like salicylic acid and hydrogen peroxide. The defensive ability has been directly linked to adenosine glycosidase activity from the RNA polynucleotide. These biological abilities are of interest because they could potentially lead to a broad action treatment of several known pathogens. Studies are currently being done in vitro to understand the extent of this defense mechanism and the range of treatment types for infections from viruses, bacteria, fungi, and even insects.

Research Findings 
Beetin 27 (BE27) has anti-pathogenic properties that are activated when exposed to hydrogen peroxide and salicylic acid.

See also
IRIP
Luffin
Lychnin
Saporin
Trichosanthin

References

Iglesias, Rosario et al. “Biological activities of the antiviral protein BE27 from sugar beet (Beta vulgaris L.).” Planta vol. 241,2 (2015): 421-33. doi:10.1007/s00425-014-2191-2

External links
AAS67266
CAA59952
CAK22417
CAK22418
CAP12514
CAP12515
NF02149930

Proteins
Ribosome-inactivating proteins